UL Flugzeugbau Quander is a German aircraft manufacturer based in Petershagen. The company specializes in the design and manufacture of ultralight trikes and powered parachutes.

Aircraft

References

External links

Archives of the Quander website on Archive.org

Aircraft manufacturers of Germany
Ultralight trikes
Powered parachutes